Camaridium is a genus of epiphytic orchids widespread across the West Indies and through Latin America from  Mexico to Bolivia.   One species extends into Florida (C. vestitum, listed in Flora of North America under the synonym, Maxillaria parviflora).

The genus was long included as part of Maxillaria but recent molecular studies have indicated that Maxillaria should be split into several genera.

References

External links

Epiphytic orchids
Maxillariinae genera
Maxillariinae